This is the 5th world tour of the Irish pop band Westlife seen by 395,000 fans.
This tour set a goal that they will play in smaller venues and for smaller audiences to justify the title "Face to Face". The filmed video album for this tour came from their performance at the Wembley Arena. This also had a second leg of the tour 'summer nights' all over the biggest UK outdoor parks, castles and racing grounds. The Live concert DVD includes the same track listing with the setlist above. While the Australian version have the DVD with their studio album Back Home with The Love Album photo shoot and the music videos for "You Raise Me Up" and "Amazing".

The lads were also meant to tour Australia but this was postponed until the next tour. This was due to recording commitments. This concert tour was marked as the first time Steve Anderson and William Baker had worked together outside of the Kylie Minogue camp.

Opening acts
4thBase 
Alsou
Roxanne
Nylon

Setlist
"Flying Without Wings"
"Hit You with the Real Thing"
"When You're Looking Like That"
"Amazing"
"She's Back (contains elements of "Billie Jean")
"Uptown Girl
Medley:
"Addicted To Love"
"Wild Wild West" (contains elements of "I Wish")
"Señorita"
"Don't Cha"
"Colour My World"
"Hey Whatever"
"The Dance"
"Swear It Again"
"Seasons in the Sun"
"World of Our Own"
"Mandy"
Encore
"Queen of My Heart"
"What Makes a Man"
"You Raise Me Up"

Tour dates

Festivals and other miscellaneous performances
This concert was a part of "Lincoln Live!"
These concerts were a part of the "Summer Nights Open Air Concert Series"
This concert was a part of the "National Trust Summer Concert Series"
This concert was a part of the "Liverpool Summer Pops"
This concert is a part of "Music on a Summer Evening"
This concert was a part of the "Newmarket Nights"
This concert was a part of "Chester Live"
This concert was a part of the "Faenol Festival"

Credits
Director: William Baker
Musical Director/Arrangements: Steve Anderson
Choreographer: Priscilla Samuels
"Uptown Girl" Brass arranged by Steve Anderson and Richard Niles

Live Concert Music DVD

Chart performance

Certifications and sales

External links

Official Westlife Website

References

Westlife concert tours
2006 concert tours